Grisy-les-Plâtres is a commune in the Val-d'Oise department in Île-de-France in northern France. The commune has a resident population of 694 (2019).

See also
Communes of the Val-d'Oise department

References

External links
Official website

Association of Mayors of the Val d'Oise 

Communes of Val-d'Oise